Switzerland competed at the 1984 Summer Olympics in Los Angeles, United States. 129 competitors, 102 men and 27 women, took part in 91 events in 18 sports.

Medalists

Archery

In Switzerland's third appearance in Olympic archery, two women and one man competed.

Women's Competition:
 Ursula Hess – 2473 points (→ 13th place)
 Vreny Burger – 2419 points (→ 27th place)

Men's Competition:
 Thomas Hardmeier – 2476 points (→ 20th place)

Athletics

Men's 400 metres 
 Marcel Arnold  
 Heat — 46.46
 Quarterfinals — 46.10 (→ did not advance)

Men's 5,000 metres 
 Markus Ryffel 
 Heat — 13:46.16
 Semifinals — 13:40.08 
 Final — 13:07.54 (→   Silver Medal)

Men's Marathon
 Bruno Lafranchi 
 Final — 2:24:38 (→ 50th place)

Men's High Jump
 Roland Dalhäuser
 Qualification — 2.24m
 Final — no mark (→ no ranking)

Men's Long Jump
 René Gloor
 Qualification — 7.71m (→ did not advance, 13th place)

Men's Pole Vault 
 Felix Böhni 
 Qualifying Round — 5.40m 
 Final — 5.30m (→ 7th place)

Men's Shot Put
 Werner Günthör
 Qualifying Round — 19.71 m
 Final — 20.28m (→ 5th place)

Men's Decathlon 
 Michele Rüfenacht 
 Final Result — 7924 points (→ 10th place)

 Patrick Vetterli 
 Final Result — 7739 points (→ 13th place)

Women's 3,000 metres 
 Cornelia Bürki 
 Heat — 8:45.82
 Final — 8:45.20 (→ 5th place)

Women's Marathon 
 Gabriela Andersen-Schiess 
 Final — 2:48:42 (→ 37th place)

Women's Javelin Throw 
 Regula Egger 
 Qualification — 57.88m (→ did not advance)

Women's Heptathlon
 Corinne Schneider
 Final Result — 6042 points (→ 10th place)

Canoeing

Cycling

Twelve cyclists represented Switzerland in 1984.

Individual road race
 Richard Trinkler — +1:43 (→ 10th place)
 Stefan Maurer — +3:37 (→ 12th place)
 Heinz Imboden — did not finish (→ no ranking)
 Benno Wiss — did not finish (→ no ranking)

Team time trial
 Alfred Achermann
 Richard Trinkler
 Laurent Vial
 Benno Wiss

Sprint
 Heinz Isler

1000m time trial
 Heinz Isler

Individual pursuit
 Jörg Müller
 Stephan Joho

Team pursuit
 Daniel Huwyler
 Hans Ledermann
 Hansruedi Märki
 Jörg Müller

Points race
 Jörg Müller
 Stephan Joho

Equestrianism

Fencing

Five fencers, all men, represented Switzerland in 1984

Men's épée
 Michel Poffet
 Daniel Giger
 Gabriel Nigon

Men's team épée
 Olivier Carrard, Daniel Giger, Gabriel Nigon, Michel Poffet, François Suchanecki

Gymnastics

Handball

Men's Team Competition
 Team Roster
 Jürgen Bätschmann
 René Barth
 Markus Braun
 Max Delhees
 Roland Gassmann
 Martin Glaser
 Peter Hürlimann
 Peter Jehle
 Heinz Karrer
 Uwe Mall
 Martin Ott
 Norwin Platzer
 Martin Rubin
 Max Schär
 Peter Weber

Judo

Modern pentathlon

Three male modern pentathletes represented Switzerland in 1984.

Individual
 Andy Jung
 Peter Steinmann
 Peter Minder

Team
 Andy Jung
 Peter Steinmann
 Peter Minder

Rhythmic gymnastics

Rowing

Sailing

Shooting

Swimming

Men's 100m Freestyle 
 Dano Halsall
 Heat — 50.91
 Final — 50.50 (→ 5th place)

 Stéfan Voléry
 Heat — 51.24 
 B-Final — 51.42 (→ 10th place)

Men's 200m Freestyle
 Stéfan Voléry
 Heat — 1:54.19 (→ did not advance, 25th place)

 Thierry Jacot
 Heat — 1:56.54 (→ did not advance, 36th place)

Men's 100m Backstroke 
 Patrick Ferland
 Heat — 58.78 (→ did not advance, 22nd place)

Men's 200m Backstroke 
 Patrick Ferland
 Heat — 2:08.31 (→ did not advance, 22nd place)

Men's 100m Breaststroke
 Étienne Dagon
 Heat — 1:05.37 (→ did not advance, 20th place)

 Felix Morf
 Heat — 1:05.89 (→ did not advance, 23rd place)

Men's 200m Breaststroke
 Étienne Dagon
 Heat — 2:18.95
 Final — 2:17.41 (→  Bronze Medal)

 Felix Morf
 Heat — DSQ (→ did not advance, no ranking)

Men's 100m Butterfly
 Théophile David
 Heat — 55.81
 B-Final — 55.40 (→ 10th place)

 Dano Halsall
 Heat — 55.35
 B-Final — 55.51 (→ 11th place)

Men's 200m Butterfly
 Théophile David
 Heat — 2:03.21 (→ did not advance, 19th place)

Men's 4 × 100 m Freestyle Relay 
 Dano Halsall, Stéfan Voléry, Thierry Jacot, and Roger Birrer
 Heat — 3:26.61 (→ did not advance, 9th place)

Men's 4 × 100 m Medley Relay 
 Patrick Ferland, Étienne Dagon, Théophile David, and Dano Halsall
 Heat — 3:48.13
 Final — 3:47.93 (→ 7th place)

Women's 100m Freestyle
 Marie-Thérèse Armentero
 Heat — 58.73 (→ did not advance, 19th place)

Women's 400m Freestyle
 Nadia Krüger
 Heat — 4:28.20 (→ did not advance, 18th place)

Women's 800m Freestyle 
 Nadia Krüger
 Heat — 9:07.95 (→ did not advance, 16th place)

Women's 4 × 100 m Medley Relay
 Eva Gysling, Patricia Brülhart, Carole Brook, and Marie-Thérèse Armentero
 Heat — 4:20.55 
 Final — 4:19.02 (→ 6th place)

Women's 100m Backstroke
 Eva Gysling
 Heat — 1:05.18
 B-Final — 1:06.11 (→ 16th place)

Women's 200m Backstroke
 Eva Gysling
 Heat — 2:25.69 (→ did not advance, 24th place)

Women's 200m Butterfly
 Carole Brook
 Heat — 2:18.66
 B-Final — 2:16.74 (→ 15th place)

Synchronized swimming

Weightlifting

Wrestling

References

Nations at the 1984 Summer Olympics
1984
1984 in Swiss sport